The SNCF X 3800 class are diesel railcars with an elevated off-center control cabin. It is often said that they were nicknamed “Picassos” because the off-center cabin was reminiscent of paintings by Pablo Picasso featuring faces where the eyes and nose were completely offset. The nickname may though have come from the number of early paint schemes applied to the class.

The X3800 served on secondary lines all over the French rail network. The elevated control cabin allowed the railcars to operate in forward and reverse modes, allowing for ease of operation. One example is preserved at the Cité du Train.

Technical Details
The X 3800 featured a mechanical transmission with a truck-type clutch and gearbox. They could haul unpowered trailers and could be operated singly or twinned with other units. The direct mechanical engine controls required each powered unit to have its own driver so they could not be operated as true multiple units. Units were built with two types of diesel engines: Renault 517 diesel powered units 3801 to 3835 and a Saurer BZDS diesel powered units 3836 to 3856. The units were designed to be robust and simple (but were noisy), often parked outside in the winter. The driver sat facing sideways in a raised cabin above the engine compartment, accessed from the baggage compartment. The main mechanical controls were directly connected by levers to the diesel engine, clutch and gearbox. The units were widely used from the 1950s to the 1980s, particularly on secondary lines with often poorer quality track than the main lines, at a lower cost than comparable steam trains of the era. The units were reliable and, from the end opposite the engine compartment, offered passengers a wide-open view of the track. The diesel engines produced 300 hp and were water-cooled. The car bodies were of welded construction.

The X 3800 were built from 1950 to 1961. 251 units were built, given unit numbers X 3801 to X 4051 by the SNCF. Each X 3800 could hold 62 passengers, with smoking and non-smoking compartments, a toilet, and a baggage area located behind the engine compartment

Routes Served
The X 3800 units were used on the majority of non-electrified lines across the entirety of France. Some of the routes served include:

  - Corbigny
 Nantes - Saint-Nazaire
 Annemasse -  (international service)
 Annemasse - Bellegarde
 Bellegarde - Divonne-les-Bains
  - Besançon
 Besançon - Bourg-en-Bresse
 Lyon - Bourg-en-Bresse
 Valence - Grenoble - Chambéry - Aix-les-Bains
 Nevers -  - 
  - Saint-Dié-des-Vosges
  - Remiremont
 Saintes - La Rochelle
 Nice - Cannes
 Caen - Argentan
 Nantes - Saint-Nazaire
 Poitiers - La Rochelle
 La Rochelle - Saintes
 Rouen - Le Havre
 Charleville-Mézières - 
 Belfort - Mulhouse
  - Abreschviller
 Vierzon - Montluçon
 Nevers - 
  - Capdenac
  - Montauban
 Agen - Montauban
  - Charleville-Mézières (international service)
 Paris - Dreux
 Paris-Est - Sézanne (later Paris-Est - La Ferté-Gaucher)
 Navettes Freyming-Merlebach - Petite-Rosselle
 Navettes Paris-Est - Paris-Ourcq
 Villefranche - Perpignan
 Bollwiller - Lautenbach

Base Depots 
 Bordeaux (1975 - 28 May 1988)
 Chalindrey (1970 - 1980)
 Châlons-sur-Marne (1958 - 1969)
 Chalon-sur-Saône (1964 - 1973)
 Clermont-Ferrand (Since 1952)
 Douai (1954 - 1968)
 Evreux (Since 1958)
 La Plaine (1975 - 1985)
 La Rochelle - Bongraine (Transferred from Saintes, 1960 - 1976)
 Laroche-Migennes (1965 - 1972)
 Le Mans-Pontlieue (1951 - 1970)
 Limoges (Since 1951)
 Longueau (1970 - 1977)
 Lyon-Perrache (1952, transferred to Lyon-Vaise in 1957)
 Lyon-Vaise (Transferred from Lyon-Perrache, 1957 - 1980)
 Marseille-Blancarde (Transferred from Marseille-Saint-Charles, 1957 - 1975)
 Marseille-Saint-Charles (February 1955, transferred to Marseille-Blancarde in 1957)
 Mohon (1959 - May 1987)
 Nancy-Heillecourt (1951 - 1970)
 Nantes (Since 1951)
 Narbonne (Since 1958)
 Nevers (1970 - May 1987)
 Nice-Saint-Roch (September 1954 - 1961)
 Noisy-le-Sec (Since 1959)
 Rouen-Orléans (Since 1951)
 Rennes (1st base depot for the class with X 3801 delivered in 1950, active until 1980)
 Rouge-Barres, près de Lille (Since 1951)
 Saintes (1951 - 1960, then transferred to La Rochelle-Bongraine )
 Sotteville (1970 - 1987, except X 3997, staying until 2014)
 Tours-Saint-Pierre (1955 - 1967)
 Vesoul (Since 1951)
 Vitry-le-François (1953 - 1960)

Notable Units 
 X 3823 was seen in the film Les Vacances du petit Nicolas
 X 3953 was renumbered to X 93953 blue and white for the ligne de Bréauté - Beuzeville à Fécamp, then renumbered back to X 3953.
 X 3896 was rebuilt on the 23 of July, 1976, by the "Ateliers de Périgueux" into a rail inspection vehicle, replacing the X 42511. As a result, it received a green livery, underlined by grey lines. Since 1988, this unit has been used by the Service de la Recherche for work on the "ASTREE" project, an early iteration of the ERTMS signalling system.
 X 3900 underwent the same rebuilding as X 3896 in 1976. In 1993, it was purchased by "l'Autorail Touristique du Minervois", held at the Clermont-Ferrand depot before operating on behalf of the "Chemins de Fer de la Haute Auvergne" (Gentiane Express) in 1997. Since then, it has been stationed at Bort-les-Orgues (19) and is undergoing an exterior refurbishment.
 X 3997 was rebuilt into a SNCF maintenance vehicle, and received a green & grey livery with orange bands. Initially, it was used for signalling maintenance/installation, later being equipped with special rail resistance-detecting wheels. In the 1990s, it was used for shunting tasks.
 An engine of this class was seen in the movie Le Corniaud

Preserved Units

Operating 
 X 3814 : Train touristique de Puisaye-Forterre (TTPPF - AATY)
 X 3817 : Chemin de fer touristique de la vallée de l'Aa
 X 3823 : Chemin de Fer de la Vendée
 X 3824 : FACS confié à l'AGRIVAP
 X 3835 : Train touristique de Puisaye-Forterre (TTPPF - AATY)
 X 3837 : Chemin de fer touristique de la Vallée de la Canner
 X 3838 : Chemin de Fer Touristique du Sud des Ardennes
 X 3850 : Chemin de Fer Touristique du Sud des Ardennes
 X 3853 : Chemin de fer touristique de la vallée de l'Aa
 X 3867 : Agrivap, ex Train Touristique du Mont des Avaloirs (Alençon-Près en Pail), racheté par Agrivap en 2000, remis en service depuis juin 2001. Visible dans le film Être et Avoir.
 X 3886 : ARE, puis revendu à l'association "Les Autorails de Bourgogne et de Franche-Comté"
 X 3890 : Association Chemins de fer du Centre-Bretagne (CFCB)
 X 3898 : Chemin de Fer Touristique du Sud des Ardennes
 X 3900 : Autorail de Commandement, basé à Bort-les-Orgues par l'association des Chemins de Fer de la Haute Auvergne Gentiane Express (cet autorail n'assurant pas pour le moment les circulations du Gentiane Express)
 X 3926 : Anciennement CFTS, aujourd'hui rénové avec 1st class entièrement d'origine par le TFBCO en vue d'une exploitation sur Mézy-Montmirail
 X 3943 : Chemin de Fer Touristique du Sud des Ardennes
 X 3944 : Restored on the 14 of May, 2001 by Train du Pays Cathare et du Fenouillèdes. En 2015, il est en cours de restauration intégrale et de réaménagement.
 X 3953 : Train touristique de la Sarthe TRANSVAP - ancien X 93953 bleu et blanc
 X 3959 : Undergoing restoration by Chemin de Fer de Charente-Limousine
 X 3968 : Chemin de fer touristique du Haut Quercy
 X 3976 : Train touristique du centre-Var, Carnoules
 X 3998 : Chemin de Fer à vapeur des Trois Vallées Mariembourg (Belgium)
 X 4001 : Chemin de Fer du Haut Forez
 X 4039 : Autorails de Bourgogne-Franche-Comté (ABFC), the only unit certified by the réseau ferré national and for 
 X 4046 : Association Autorail Lorraine Champagne Ardenne

Non-operable, preserved for parts, or scrapped 
 X 3801 : Chemin de Fer Touristique des Hautes Falaises (Wreck)
 X 3810 : Train touristique du centre-Var (Wreck)
 X 3818 : Chemin de Fer Touristique de la Traconne (purchased by the town of Sézanne )
 X 3825 : Train touristique du Cotentin, sold in 1998 to Quercyrail (Out of service)
 X 3846 : Chemin de Fer Touristique du Minervois (Scrapped in 2012)
 X 3847 : Musée de Mulhouse, front third preserved - front compartment, motor and driver's cabin
 X 3865 : Train touristique de l'Ardèche méridionale, association Viaduc 07 (Scrapped in July 2010).
 X 3866 : Chemin de fer touristique du Vermandois (Out of service, undergoing a restoration)	
 X 3871 : Train touristique de Puisaye-Forterre (TTPPF - AATY) (Wreck)
 X 3876 : Auberge du chemin de Fer de Lanester (56) (Transformed into a cottage)
 X 3897 : ACTA (Wreck)
 X 3907 : Tourism unit Étretat-Pays de Caux (Wrecked and scrapped)
 X 3934 : Agrivap (Severely damaged in a 1998 collision, select pieces recovered, chassis scrapped). 
 X 3937 : Association de modélistes Rambolitrain, Rambouillet (78) (Scrapped, motor purchased by Agrivap)
 X 3997 : Rail inspection vehicle (Sent to the Culoz demolition facility in February 2014)
 X 4013 : Served as a locker room for a night club in the old Sancerre station (18) (Scrapped)
 X 4025 : Preserved by the ABFC in Perrigny-lès-Dijon (21) (Scrapped in 2001)
 X 4028 : CFT du Minervois, in Narbonne (11) - Stationed by TPCF at Caudiès (Scrapped in March 2013)
 X 4042 : Musée de la Mine du Carreau Wendel (Out of service)
 X 4051 : CFTA-Carhaix (Out of service)

Model Renditions 
This unit has been represented in HO scale by the Jouef, LS Models, Mistral Trains Models groups and the Editions Atlas (static), as well as N scale by Transmondia. In O scale, AMJL offered Picasso kits or assembled.

Anecdotes 
X 4046 preserved by l'association Autorail Lorraine Champagne-Ardenne, served as the setting for the song by Laurent Voulzy, "Paradoxal Système" in 1992.

Photo Gallery

References 

3800
Diesel multiple units of France